Eastern Suburbs (now known as the Sydney Roosters) competed in their 59th New South Wales Rugby League season in 1966.

Eastern Suburbs line-up

 Gwyl Barnes
 Kevin Junee
 Ron Saddler
 J. Mathews
 T. Gallagher
 Kevin Ashley
 C. Boyd
 R. Henspy
 G. Morgan
 Terry Mathews
 D. McCraig
 Ken McMullen
 T. Higham
 Ken Ashcroft
 J. Bissett
 G. Mayhew

Season summary

 This was Eastern Suburbs' worst ever season, failing to win a single match and finishing with the wooden spoon - the fourth in the club's history and its last until 2009. This was the last time that any side has endured a winless season.

References

 The Story Of Australian Rugby League, Gary Lester

Sydney Roosters seasons
Eastern Suburbs season
East